Round of Your Life is a 2019 American sports film directed by Dylan Thomas Ellis and starring Evan Hara, Richard T. Jones, Katie Leclerc, Allie DeBerry and Tim Ogletree.

Cast
Boo Arnold as Carl Collins
Katherine Willis
Tim Ogletree as Tucker
Evan Hara as Taylor
Richard T. Jones as Coach Wilson
Allie DeBerry as Bailey
Blair Jackson as Connor
Katie Leclerc as Minka

Reception
The film has  rating on Rotten Tomatoes.  Bill Goodykoontz of The Arizona Republic awarded the film two stars and wrote, "You want to root for it, but it never quite measures up."  Kimber Myers of the Los Angeles Times gave the film a positive review and wrote "Director Dylan Thomas Ellis has made a gentle, inoffensive film that preaches as much about the power of prayer as the dangers of texting and driving."

References

External links
 
 

American sports drama films
2019 films
2010s English-language films
2010s American films